Balkan Idols: Religion and Nationalism in Yugoslav States is a book by Vjekoslav Perica. It was first published in 2002 by Oxford University Press.

The book explores the political roles of different religious organisations in the republics of the former Yugoslavia. The notion that a "clash of civilizations" played a central role in creating aggression is rejected by the author. The book was described as a significant work in several reviews in academic journals.

Reviews
"Vjekoslav Perica brilliantly recounts the role of religious narratives, institutions, organizations, and, most importantly, church or religious authorities both in constituting the three dominant identities of Yugoslavs and, in turn, in appropriating those narratives and identities for the destruction of the Yugoslav state and the possibility of civic and civil life in it... Fundamentalism is the enemy of all that makes democracies functional and civility possible, whether in secular, religious, nationalist, patriotic, or ethnic clothing. Perica's contribution to our understanding of this phenomenon is immense."
––Journal of the American Academy of Religion.

"Vjekoslav Perica's masterfully written and extensively researched book fills an important gap in the historical scholarship on twentieth century southeastern Europe."
––Association of Contemporary Church Historians

"[The] merging of national and religious identity defines the objective of Perica’s monograph: rather than attempting to explain the dissolution of Yugoslavia by factors related to religion, the aim is to trace the influence of religious institutions on nation-formation and political legitimacy in Yugoslavia."
––Peter Korchnak, in: The Global Review of Ethnopolitics

References

External links
Oxford University Press' webpage for Balkan Idols: Religion and Nationalism in Yugoslav States

2002 non-fiction books
Books about nationalism